Danrley Ulisses Paulo Dubois Feitosa (born 22 March 2001), simply known as Danrley, is a Brazilian footballer who plays as a midfielder for Palmeiras, on loan from Ponte Preta.

Club career
Born in Nova Iguaçu, Rio de Janeiro, Danrley joined Ponte Preta's youth setup in 2019, from Real Sport Clube. In December 2019, he was promoted to the former's first team for the 2020 Campeonato Paulista.

Danrley made his first team debut on 30 January 2020, coming on as a second-half substitute for João Paulo in a 2–1 home win against Corinthians. On 20 February of the following year, after featuring sparingly, he was loaned to Palmeiras until December, and returned to the youth setup.

Career statistics

References

External links

2001 births
Living people
People from Nova Iguaçu
Brazilian footballers
Association football midfielders
Campeonato Brasileiro Série B players
Campeonato Brasileiro Série C players
Associação Atlética Ponte Preta players
Volta Redonda FC players
Sportspeople from Rio de Janeiro (state)